Parish Riegel is a riegel, or rock bar extending north from Parish Ledge, Olympus Range, across McKelvey Valley toward Insel Range. The riegel is 2 nautical miles (3.7 km) long, 1 nautical mile (1.9 km) wide, and is similar to Bonney Riegel in Taylor Valley. Named by Advisory Committee on Antarctic Names (US-ACAN) (2004) in association with Parish Ledge.

Ridges of Victoria Land
McMurdo Dry Valleys